was a Japanese samurai of the Sengoku period, who served the Takeda clan. He died at the fourth battle of Kawanakajima in 1561.

Samurai
1533 births
1561 deaths
Takeda retainers